CBRX-FM is a Canadian radio station which broadcasts SRC's Ici Musique network at 101.5 FM in Rimouski, Quebec.

The station launched as CJBR in 1947 and changed to its current callsign in the 1990s after receiving CRTC approval to broadcast at 101.5 MHz.

Transmitters
The station has rebroadcast transmitters in the following communities:
 Matane - 107.5
 Rivière-du-Loup - 90.7
 Sept-Îles - 96.1

All three transmitters received CRTC approval in 2002.

See also
CJBR-FM

References

External links
ICI Musique
 
 

Brx
Brx
Brx
Radio stations established in 1947
1947 establishments in Quebec